Denis Burgarella (born 8 May 1960 in Marseille, France) is a French astrophysicist working at Laboratoire d'astrophysique de Marseille. He was president of SF2A from 2008 to 2010. He was president of the J1 commission of the International Astronomical Union (IAU) from 2015 to 2018. From 2018 to 2021, he is president of IAU Division J. (Galaxies and Cosmology)

Education
Denis Burgarella studied in Marseille (Lycée Marcel Pagnol) from 1975 to 1978. From 1978 to 1982, he studied at Université Aix-Marseille II (now Aix-Marseille University) DEUG A (Mathematics and Physics), in Licence de Physique, Maîtrise de Physique and DEA in Computer Sciences. After that, he moved to Nice University where he got a PhD in Astrophysics (actually done in LAM), Images of the Universe (Nov. 1987).

 1984 - 1987: PhD in Laboratoire d'Astronomie Spatiale de Marseille (now Laboratoire d'Astrophysique de Marseille)
 1987 - 1989: CNES Post-doc Laboratoire d'Astronomie Spatiale de Marseille (now Laboratoire d'Astrophysique de Marseille)
 1989 - 1992: Post-doc PhD in Space Telescope Science Institute (STScI)
 1992 - Now: Permanent position (Astronomer) in Laboratoire d'Astrophysique de Marseille

Research
His research works are about galaxy at all redshifts (z), in a cosmological context and more specifically on the formation and evolution of galaxies and the detection, identification and study of galaxies in the early universe using a multi-wavelength approach (Spectral Energy Distribution, SED) via observation and modelling. In Burgarella et al. (2020)). Denis Burgarella and his colleagues have identified and characterised (some of) the first dust grains created from stars in the universe at redshifts 5 < z < 10.
To understand these galaxies, they have developed, with Médéric Boquien and a team to seven people, a code that models the emission of galaxies from the X-rays to the sub-mm: CIGALE, Code Investigating GALaxy Emission). CIGALE is parallelised in Python 3 and is designed to fit large samples of several ten of thousands observed SEDs by comparing the observed data to several 100 million models.

References 

Living people
21st-century French astronomers
20th-century French astronomers
French astrophysicists
Scientists from Marseille
Aix-Marseille University
1960 births